Mehad Hamad Mehad, is an Emirati artist and singer.

Career
Hamad mainly interprets traditional Emirati songs, often accomplished by an oud. He is well known in the United Arab Emirates for his songs about the desert and his patriotic songs.

Hamad has introduced new Khaliji-style songs, like "Ya Habibi". He has also worked with Tyrese Gibson, and has set the words of Ousha bint Khalifa Al Suwaidi to music.

Discography

Albums

2014: La Tardini Hudud

Top songs
2015: Laish Ana As'al
2014: Bargen Laa7
1999: Khams el 7awas
1998: Taal Laily
1997: mar7ba b6aresh
1997: 
1996: yoom alwdaa3
1994: Tedalal
1992: La TeThaKeRny Be7BeK
1990: Wada3tkum
1989: Basmtek

References

External links
 Mehad Hamad Official Site

Emirati male singers
Living people
People from the Emirate of Sharjah
Year of birth missing (living people)